Alexander Klingspor (born 1977 in Stockholm) is a contemporary Swedish painter and sculptor who has worked in Sweden and the United States.

Overview
Klingspor left Sweden for the United States and was apprenticed to the American illustrator and painter Mark English in Kansas City, Missouri. He then returned to Stockholm in Sweden and joined the workshop of Magnus Bratt, a copyist artist for the National Museum of Sweden, who specializes in 16th-century oil paintings.

Klingspor has worked in Sweden and the United States, based in Stockholm and New York City. His themes explore the unconscious mind with a surreal quality. Klingspor's exhibitions include:

 2000 – Gallery Stenlund, Stockholm, Sweden
 2002 – Cercle Suedois, Paris, France
 2003, 2004, 2006, 2009 – Arcadia Gallery, New York City, United States
 2005 – Gallery Agardh & Tornvall, Stockholm, Sweden
 2007 – Christie's, Stockholm, Sweden
 2008 – LA Art Fair, Los Angeles, United States
 2008, 2013 – A Gallery, Gothenborg, Sweden
 2010 – Hotel Diplomat Gallery, Stockholm, Sweden
 2012 – Albemarle Gallery, London, United Kingdom
 2018 – "Surreal Alternative", RJD Gallery, Bridgehampton, New York, United States
 2019 – "Eat The Night", RJD Gallery, Bridgehampton, New York, United States
 2022 – Mollbrink's Art Gallery, London Art Fair, Business Design Centre, London, United Kingdom

Klingspor has been represented by the Albemarle Gallery in London, England, and the A Gallery in Gothenborg, Sweden. He has studios in New York City and at Stockholm's Royal Academy. Klingspor's works are held in the collections of Iris Cantor, Whoopie Goldberg, Salman Rushdie, and Stellan Skarsård. He is painted portraits of the economist Hans Tson Söderström and the CEO of Atlas Copco, Electrolux, and Ericsson, Michael Trescow.

Gallery

Selected publications
Magazines
 
 
 
 
 
 
 
 

Books

References

External links

1977 births
Living people
People from Stockholm
21st-century Swedish painters
21st-century Swedish sculptors
21st-century American painters
21st-century American sculptors
21st-century American male artists